Saikat Chakrabarti (born January 12, 1986) is a political advisor and software engineer. He was formerly chief of staff to Alexandria Ocasio-Cortez, the U.S. representative from New York's 14th congressional district representing portions of The Bronx and Queens in New York City.

On August 2, 2019, he left Ocasio-Cortez's office to run New Consensus, a group promoting the Green New Deal.

Early life and education
Chakrabarti was born in 1986 and raised in an Bengali Hindu family in Fort Worth, Texas. He attended Harvard University, graduating in 2007 with a Bachelor of Arts in computer science.

Career 
After college, Chakrabarti worked on Wall Street followed by six years in Silicon Valley at a number of startups. Chakrabarti co-founded a web design company called Mockingbird and served as a founding engineer at the payments processing company Stripe.

Bernie Sanders campaign and Brand New Congress
In 2015, Chakrabarti joined the early stages of U.S. Senator Bernie Sanders's presidential campaign. Of that decision, Chakrabarti told Rolling Stone, "I wasn't entirely sure he had all the right solutions but I knew he was talking about the right problems."

Chakrabarti became the Sanders campaign's Director of Organizing Technology and was part of the effort that created technology for grassroots supporters to collaborate on organizing events. Together with Sheena Pakanati, he developed a messaging tool called Spoke which was released under the MIT license. The software helped volunteers find other volunteers who lived nearby and helped coordinate "millions" of volunteers to call into battleground states, multiplying the effort of local volunteers and staff. Chakrabarti's technological edge is credited with being "a major component in the success of Sanders' presidential run".

During the Sanders campaign Chakrabarti worked closely with Alexandra Rojas and Corbin Trent to stage campaign events around the country. Charkrabarti told Rolling Stone that he often heard voters express strong concerns about Congress: "people would say, 'How's he going to get anything done? We just saw what Congress did to Obama for the last eight years, they’re gonna do the same thing to Bernie.'" As a result, in the spring of 2016, Chakrabarti (together with Rojas and Trent) co-founded the Brand New Congress political action committee, to recruit 400 new candidates for Congress. Chakrabarti told Rachel Maddow in 2016, the goal was to have unified fundraising of small donors modeled on the Sanders campaign in hopes of politicians who work for their voters rather than spend their time seeking donations. The group received many applications and recruited 12 candidates, of whom only Alexandria Ocasio-Cortez won a seat in Congress.

Justice Democrats
In early 2017, after Trump's election, Chakrabarti, Zack Exley, a former fellow Bernie Sanders presidential campaign executive, Cenk Uygur of The Young Turks and Kyle Kulinski of Secular Talk became co-founders of the Justice Democrats. As Chakrabarti, Rojas, and Trent were less involved with Brand New Congress, they became leaders of the Justice Democrats. Chakrabarti, as an executive director of Justice Democrats wrote software to organize in a "distributed fashion". Justice Democrats targeted an entrenched "corporate Democrat" in Joe Crowley. The group recruited Ocasio-Cortez to challenge Joe Crowley and "helped get her campaign off the ground, build an email list and raise $30,000." Activist strategies mobilized by Justice Democrats contributed greatly to Alexandria Ocasio-Cortez's primary win, according to The Intercept.

Before U.S. Senator Al Franken resigned, Chakrabarti went on record to push for his resignation and expressed his support for Keith Ellison as his replacement.

Alexandria Ocasio-Cortez chief of staff
Chakrabarti was campaign manager for Ocasio-Cortez's unexpected primary victory over 10-term incumbent Joe Crowley, and afterwards became her campaign chair. While her general election victory in the heavily Democratic district was considered a foregone conclusion, Chakrabarti leveraged her newfound high profile to campaign for other progressive candidates across the country. After she won the November 2018 general election, she appointed him as her chief of staff.

In 2019, Chakrabarti was named to the Politico Playbook power list to watch.

Green New Deal
Chakrabarti led the Ocasio-Cortez staff and several progressive groups in writing the Green New Deal resolution that was submitted to the House of Representatives by Ocasio-Cortez and to the Senate by Ed Markey February 7, 2019. The New Yorker quoted him as saying, "We spent the weekend learning how to put laws together. We looked up how to write resolutions." The Washington Post quoted him as well:

"it wasn't originally a climate thing at all... we really think of it as a how-do-you-change-the-entire-economy thing."

Chakrabarti expressed a vision of what Democrats should try to do while Republicans hold power in the Senate and Presidency:

Relating that to the policies Ocasio-Cortez proposes and supports via Twitter, Chakrabarti told Brian Stelter on CNN's "Reliable Sources":

Amazon HQ2 withdrawal from Queens
In February 2019, Chakrabarti appeared as a guest on Bloomberg News to clarify Ocasio-Cortez's role in Amazon's decision to pull its planned HQ2 from Long Island City, Queens, saying she objected to the process by which it had received its original deal, but had no specific animus toward the company. He stated that AOC's goal had been to see the local community more involved in discussions, but once community members joined the discussion, Amazon made the decision to withdraw. Chakrabarti elaborated further that Amazon would be welcome to return to the negotiating table under the condition that the company engage adequately with the local communities to be affected by the project.

Immigration reform
Chakrabarti worked on the part of the Justice Democrats platform which included abolishing Immigration and Customs Enforcement (ICE). To the question of whether a different agency should take its place, he replied "everyone has a different idea of what happens after". While working for Alexandria Ocasio-Cortez, he supported a move to approach the debate by highlighting the economic value of welcoming foreign workers.

In a June 27 tweet, Chakrabarti wrote that the New Democrats and Blue Dog Caucus should be called "the New Southern Democrats" for voting to "enable a racist system". This was in response to Democratic representatives approving an aid package which included funding for southern border enforcement. The House Democratic Caucus Twitter account, managed by Hakeem Jeffries, objected to him referring to Sharice Davids by name in these posts.

Resignation as chief of staff
On August 2, 2019, Representative Ocasio-Cortez announced that Saikat Chakrabarti "has decided to leave the office to work with New Consensus to further develop plans for a Green New Deal." That same day, in an interview with The Intercept, Chakrabarti said he would be starting work with New Consensus, an organization dedicated to the Green New Deal, the congresswoman’s "ambitious climate, economic, and racial justice agenda." A subsequent article in The New York Times suggested a connection between this departure and Ocasio-Cortez's adoption of a more moderate strategy for working with conservative colleagues.

See also

 Indian Americans in New York City
 Progressivism in the United States

References

1986 births
Living people
Bengali Hindus
21st-century Bengalis
Bengali scientists
American political activists
American politicians of Indian descent
Campaign managers
Members of the Democratic Socialists of America
Harvard School of Engineering and Applied Sciences alumni
People from Fort Worth, Texas
American people of Bengali descent
Web designers